Nathan Júnior Soares de Carvalho (born 10 March 1989) is a Brazilian professional footballer who plays as a striker for FC Telavi in Georgia.

Club career

Early career
Born in Rio de Janeiro, as a teenager Nathan Júnior played for his local club Clube de Regatas do Flamengo and was a member of the club's system. At the age of 16 he tried to get into the first team unsuccessfully and a year later got an offer to join Anorthosis Famagusta academy in Cyprus, which was accepted by the player, and in July 2005 he joined the Cypriot side, spending the next three seasons there.

Skonto Riga
With the help of former Anorthosis Famagusta player and Latvian international Marians Pahars Júnior was taken on trial at Skonto Riga in July 2008. He signed a four-year contract as the trial was successful. Right after joining Júnior found it difficult to fit into the squad, as there were many experienced players, and was soon loaned out to Olimps/RFS. He played 15 matches that season and was mainly used in the right-back position.

In December 2008 Júnior returned to Skonto Riga and was mainly used as a late game substitute by that time club's manager Paul Ashworth. In 2009 Skonto had a lack of forwards as two of them left right before the start of the season, and Júnior was tried out as a forward. He scored twice on his new position debut against Jūrmala-VV, and later on remained in that position. He played 19 games and scored 5 goals in the 2009 season, and was notified as a forward in the squad for the 2010 season. He made a big surprise in the upcoming season, scoring 18 goals in 24 league matches and sharing the top-scorer's honour with Liepājas Metalurgs striker Deniss Rakels, who had also netted 18 times respectively. In 2010 Skonto became the champions of Latvia. After the impressive season Júnior went on trials with Maccabi Haifa in Israel, Dynamo Moscow in Russia and Energie Cottbus in Germany, but didn't settle there.

At the start of 2011 season Júnior suffered an injury and didn't appear in the first league matches of the season. Despite lack of gaming practice, he showed his ability right after being declared fit, and soon became the leading scorer of the league yet again. He was named the league's best player in July 2011. Although, Skonto had a poor season and finished only in the 4th place of the Latvian Higher League, Júnior became the league's top scorer with 22 goals in 26 games. After the season, he was included in the LFF and sportacentrs.com teams of the tournament and was also named the best forward of the season.

Kapfenberger SV
At the end of 2011 Júnior went on trial with the Austrian Bundesliga club Kapfenberger SV and signed a contract with them in January 2012.

Tokushima Vortis
On 31 January 2018, Tokushima Vortis announced the signing of Nathan Júnior.

Paços Ferreira
After seven months without club, Nathan signed with Paços Ferreira on 31 January 2019 after a trial. He left the club at the end of the year.

Académico Viseu
On 31 January 2019, Nathan moved to another Portuguese club, Académico Viseu, after being without club since leaving Paços Ferreira in the summer 2019. However, he played only 27 minutes.

FC Samtredia
Nathan then returned to Georgia, where he signed with FC Samtredia in August 2020.

International career
Nathan Júnior has not represented Brazil at any level yet. In an interview for sportacentrs.com the player admitted that he would be interested in representing Latvia, but as the Latvian law does not allow more than one citizenship, Júnior would have to waive the Brazilian passport and play in Latvia for at least five years. The player said that it would be a serious decision, but after moving to Austria this question has been put aside.

Career statistics

Club

Honours

Club
Skonto Riga
Latvian First League: 2010
Baltic League: 2010–11, Runner-up 2008

Individual
 Virsliga top-scorer (2): 2010, 2011

References

External links
 Profile at imscouting.com
 
 
 Nathan Júnior at Paços Ferreira's website

1989 births
Living people
Footballers from Rio de Janeiro (city)
Association football forwards
Brazilian footballers
Brazilian expatriate footballers
CR Flamengo footballers
Anorthosis Famagusta F.C. players
Skonto FC players
Kapfenberger SV players
JFK Olimps players
FC Dila Gori players
FC SKA-Khabarovsk players
C.D. Tondela players
Al-Fateh SC players
Tokushima Vortis players
F.C. Paços de Ferreira players
Académico de Viseu F.C. players
FC Samtredia players
Latvian Higher League players
Austrian Football Bundesliga players
Primeira Liga players
Saudi Professional League players
Erovnuli Liga players
Liga Portugal 2 players
Russian First League players
Brazilian expatriate sportspeople in Cyprus
Brazilian expatriate sportspeople in Latvia
Brazilian expatriate sportspeople in Austria
Brazilian expatriate sportspeople in Saudi Arabia
Brazilian expatriate sportspeople in Japan
Brazilian expatriate sportspeople in Portugal
Brazilian expatriate sportspeople in Georgia (country)
Brazilian expatriate sportspeople in Russia
Expatriate footballers in Cyprus
Expatriate footballers in Latvia
Expatriate footballers in Austria
Expatriate footballers in Saudi Arabia
Expatriate footballers in Japan
Expatriate footballers in Portugal
Expatriate footballers in Georgia (country)
Expatriate footballers in Russia